Pudhumai Penn may refer to:

 Pudhumai Penn (1959 film)
 Pudhumai Penn (1984 film)